Guitar Hero 5 is the fifth main title in the Guitar Hero series of rhythm games, released worldwide in September 2009 for the Xbox 360, PlayStation 2 and 3 and Wii consoles. In the game, players use special instrument controllers to simulate the playing of lead and bass guitar, drums, and vocals for rock and other songs. Players are awarded points by performing specific actions on the controllers to match notes that scroll on screen that correspond with the appropriate instrument. Successfully hitting notes increases the player's scoring and performance meter, while missing too many notes will lower the performance meter and may cause the song to end prematurely. Songs can be played either by oneself, competitively with other players in several game modes, or cooperative with up to three other players in their own virtual band. Although traditionally a four-player band can have one player on each instrument, Guitar Hero 5 allows any four-player combination of these instruments to be used, such as a band composed of four drummers. Guitar Hero 5 is considered by its developers to be an expansion of the series into more "social play", featuring modes such as Party Play, which allows players to drop in and out and change difficulty in the middle of a song without worrying about failing or losing points.
Guitar Hero 5 is distributed with 85 songs on-disc, many being from artists that have yet to have their music featured in a rhythm video game, and more than half having been published in the last decade. The setlist was considered the weakest part of the game; although it was praised for its diversity, critics believed that the widely varying genres represented would mean that players would not enjoy every song in the game. Guitar Hero 5 is the first game in the series to reuse content from previous Guitar Hero games. Most of the existing downloadable content for Guitar Hero World Tour can be reused in Guitar Hero 5 without additional cost, while for a small fee, players can import a selection of songs from Guitar Hero World Tour and Guitar Hero Smash Hits into Guitar Hero 5. Such content is incorporated into the main game modes. Critics praised the ability to reuse content from older games, but felt that more songs should have been transferable when the game was launched. Activision no longer provides new downloadable content for Guitar Hero 5 since the release of Guitar Hero: Warriors of Rock in September 2010.

Main setlist
Excluding its downloadable content, Guitar Hero 5 features 85 songs, all based on master recordings or live performances, from 83 musicians. Tracks from 30 artists represent their "music-rhythm video game debut". Game director Brian Bright has called the track list "fresh";  25% of the songs were released in the last 18 months, and more than 50% from the current decade. Unlike previous versions of the Guitar Hero series, in which players must work through a career mode to unlock all the songs in the game, all songs in Guitar Hero 5 are unlocked and are playable in any mode from the start. However, a Career mode is presented in the game, similar to Guitar Hero: Metallica, in which players acquire a number of stars from their performances in earlier venues to unlock new venues. The song order within the venues remains the same regardless of the number of players or the instruments played. Venues are generally ordered by overall song difficulty; songs become more difficult in later venues. Also, 69 of the songs are importable into Band Hero for a nominal fee.

Critics appreciated many of Guitar Hero 5s features, but found the soundtrack to be the weakest feature of the game. Matt Helgeson of Game Informer called the track list "extremely diverse", and Arthur Gies of GameSpy felt that the song selection was based on "careful consideration for the most part", to avoid songs with short-lived appeal. However, the variety of songs  was found to also work against the game. Reviewers noted that players would find songs they liked, but at the same time, would find songs they loathed. Erik Brudvig of IGN noted that while "the goal was to include a bit of everything", the range of songs on the track list "ensure[s] that nobody will like everything on the disc". The soundtrack's diversity also affected the Career progression; while the guitar difficulty progression in the Career mode was considered better than in previous games, it left the vocals and drummer progression "all over the place".

The songs in Guitar Hero 5'''s track list are listed below, including the year of the song's recording, song title, artist, venue where the song is played in the Career progression, and whether or not the track is exportable for Band Hero, Guitar Hero: Warriors of Rock or other future games.

Importable content

On release of Guitar Hero 5, 35 of the songs from World Tour and 21 from Smash Hits are importable into Guitar Hero 5 for a small fee (approximately $0.10 per song), and are treated as downloadable content for the game playable in all game modes; the World Tour export was available on release, while the Smash Hits export was available a few days afterwards. Furthermore, 61 of the 65 tracks from Band Hero are importable into Guitar Hero 5. All transferred songs are also playable in Band Hero. However, Guitar Hero 5 is not backwards-compatible with World Tour. The transfer process requires the player to enter a unique code from the World Tour or Smash Hits manual to be able to redownload available songs in a pack (on the Xbox 360 or PlayStation 3) or individual songs (on the Wii) that have been updated to include the new features. Players on the Xbox 360 or PlayStation 3 can delete individual songs after downloading the pack. Some songs are not transferable because of licensing issues—not technical issues—according to Bright. Tim Riley, the head of music licensing at Activision, stated that the company will continue to seek licenses for more songs from previous games and downloadable content to be exported into Guitar Hero 5, but cannot guarantee that these songs will be licensed for future Guitar Hero games. While reviewers appreciated Activision's efforts to allow the importing of songs from previous games, they felt that the small number of tracks that were available at launch was at odds with the impression that Activision had made of the process before the game's release.

On September 28, 2010, 39 songs from Guitar Hero: Metallica were also made available to import. These were the last downloadable songs made available for Guitar Hero 5 and Band Hero before the move to Guitar Hero: Warriors of Rock ended the flow of DLC for those games.

Downloadable contentGuitar Hero 5 supports downloadable content. However, on March 31, 2014, Activision removed all downloadable content and there is no evidence it will be available again.

The first songs were made available shortly after the game's release. In addition, 152 of the 158 available downloadable songs for Guitar Hero World Tour are forward-compatible with Guitar Hero 5 and Band Hero; the existing content is automatically upgraded to include all features new to these games and was immediately available to players upon release of Guitar Hero 5. Downloaded songs can be used in all game modes, provided all players have the song, including in the game's Career mode when players are given the option to select any song to play. The entire Guitar Hero 5 DLC library is also available in Band Hero, and vice versa, so both games embrace the same DLC library.

September 7, 2010 saw the release of the last track pack for Guitar Hero 5;  All existing Guitar Hero 5 downloadable content is forward-compatible with Warriors of Rock, however, Warriors of Rock add-on content is not backward-compatible with Guitar Hero 5 and Band Hero''.

References

External links
 Official website

5